The Office Party is a 1976 British sex comedy directed by David Grant and starring Alan Lake, Johnny Briggs, Pamela Grafton, Ellie Reece-Knight and Theresa Wood. It depicts the sexual misadventures of staff enjoying an office party where a blue movie is one of the main attractions. The hardcore export version also exists.

During the making of the film, Grant got into a furious row with Johnny Briggs, after Briggs refused to bare all for the film. Briggs feared such exposure could damage his reputation, and a furious Grant threatened to fire him.  After the intervention of Briggs’ agent, a compromise was reached and Briggs performed the offending scene with his underpants on.  Briggs later recalled this story in his autobiography, noting that after the film he vowed never to work with Grant again.

Cast
 Alan Lake ...  Mr. Barnes  
 Johnny Briggs ...  Peter  
 Pamela Grafton ...  Miss Peabody  
 Ellie Reece-Knight ...  Jackie
 Theresa Wood ...  Sally
 Steve Amber ...  Bryan  
 Julia Bond  ...  Samantha Worthington  
 Caroline Funnell ...  Judith  
 Chris Gannon ...  Mr. Palmer  
 David Rayner ...  Francis  
 David Rodigan ...  Jose  
 Jeanne Starbuck ...  Mrs. O'Flaherty  
 Vicky Hamilton-King ...  Mrs. Barnes 
 Jason White ...  Australian Lover

References

External links

1976 films
1970s English-language films
Workplace comedy films
British sex comedy films
1976 comedy films
1970s sex comedy films
1970s British films